Reade Baker (born April 30, 1947, in Port Dalhousie, Ontario) is a retired trainer of Thoroughbred racehorses who was voted the 2005 Sovereign Award for Outstanding Trainer in Canada and who in 2018 was inducted into the Canadian Horse Racing Hall of Fame. During his career Reade Baker trained horses that won 13 National Championships of which two earned Canadian Horse of the Year honors.

Career
At age eighteen, Reade Baker worked in Toronto as a groom and exercise rider for Canadian Hall of Fame trainer Pete McCann. He went on to spend six years as the agent for jockey Gary Stahlbaum then in 1985 was hired as the racing manager for prominent Thoroughbred owner Richard R. Kennedy. In 1990 Baker opened a public stable.

External link
 Official website for Reade Baker Racing Stable, Inc.

References 

1947 births
Living people
Canadian horse trainers
Sovereign Award winners
Sportspeople from Ontario